Susan Williams McElroy is an American economist who is an Associate Professor of Economics and Education Policy at the University of Texas-Dallas. She is a former president of the National Economic Association.

Selected research publications 

 Hotz, V. Joseph, Susan Williams McElroy, and Seth G. Sanders. "Teenage childbearing and its life cycle consequences exploiting a natural experiment." Journal of Human Resources 40, no. 3 (2005): 683-715.
 Hotz, V. Joseph, Susan Williams McElroy, and Seth G. Sanders. "The impacts of teenage childbearing on the mothers and the consequences of those impacts for government." Kids having kids: Economic costs and social consequences of teen pregnancy (1997): 55-94.
 McElroy, Susan Williams. "Early childbearing, high school completion, and college enrollment: Evidence from 1980 high school sophomores." Economics of Education Review 15, no. 3 (1996): 303-324.
 McElroy, Susan Williams, and Leon T. Andrews Jr. "The black male and the US economy." The Annals of the American Academy of Political and Social Science 569, no. 1 (2000): 160-175.
 Fernandes, Ronald, Inhyuck Steve Ha, Susan Williams McElroy, and Samuel L. Myers. "Black-White disparities in test scores: Distributional characteristics." The Review of Black Political Economy 43, no. 2 (2016): 209-232.

Community roles 
McElroy is on the Executive Committee of the Dallas Black Chamber of Commerce, and serves as volunteer economist-in-residence for the Interdenominational Ministerial Alliance of Greater Dallas and Vicinity (IMA), which presented her with its 2017 President's Award for her efforts.

References 

American women economists
21st-century American economists
Labor economists
University of Texas at Dallas faculty
Living people
Princeton University alumni
Stanford University alumni
African-American economists
American women academics
African-American educators
Year of birth missing (living people)
Presidents of the National Economic Association
21st-century African-American people
21st-century African-American women